The 2015–16 Stetson Hatters women's basketball team will represent Stetson University in the 2015–16 NCAA Division I women's basketball season. The Hatters were coached by eighth year head coach Lynn Bria and were members of the Atlantic Sun Conference. They finished the season 20–12, 9–5 in A-Sun play to finish in third place. They advanced to the semifinals A-Sun women's tournament where they lost to Florida Gulf Coast. They were invited to the Women's Basketball Invitational where they defeated McNeese State in the first round before losing to Louisiana–Lafayette in the quarterfinals.

Media
All home games and conference road will be shown on ESPN3 or A-Sun.TV. Non conference road games will typically be available on the opponents website. Audio broadcasts of Hatters games can be found on WSBB AM 1230/1490 with Ryan Rouse on the call.

Roster

Schedule

|-
!colspan=9 style="background:#; color:#FFFFFF;"| Non-conference regular season

|-
!colspan=9 style="background:#; color:#FFFFFF;"| Atlantic Sun regular season

|-
!colspan=9 style="background:#; color:#FFFFFF;"| Atlantic Sun Tournament

|-
!colspan=9 style="background:#; color:#FFFFFF;"| WBI

See also
2015–16 Stetson Hatters men's basketball team

References

Stetson
Stetson Hatters women's basketball seasons
Stetson
Stetson Hatters
Stetson Hatters